is an important Shinto sanctuary on the banks of the Kamo River in north Kyoto, first founded in 678.

It is one of the oldest Shinto shrines in Japan and is one of the seventeen Historic Monuments of Ancient Kyoto which have been designated by UNESCO as a World Heritage Site. The term Kamo-jinja   in Japanese is a general reference to Shimogamo Shrine and Kamigamo Shrine, the traditionally linked Kamo shrines of Kyoto. The Kamo-jinja serve the function of protecting Kyoto from malign influences.

The jinja name identifies the Kamo family of kami or deities who are venerated.  The name also refers to the ambit of shrine's nearby woods, which are vestiges of the primeval forest of Tadasu no Mori. In addition, the shrine name references the area's early inhabitants, the Kamo clan, many of whom continue to live near the shrine their ancestors traditionally served.

Kamogamo Shrine is dedicated to the veneration of Kamo Wake-ikazuchi, the kami of thunder.

History

[[File:Karasu-zumo a.jpg|thumb|Karasu-zumo - lit. "crow sumo", a part of the festivities held each year at the shrine during Choyo.]]
The shrine became the object of Imperial patronage during the early Heian period.

Records from the reign of Emperor Heizei (806-809) mention that Kamo-mioya jinja was amongst a select number of establishments which had been granted a divine seal for use on documents.  The seal would have been enshrined in its own unique mikoshi (Oshite jinja). This granting of a special seal and the practices associated with its use and preservation conformed to a pattern established by Emperor Kōnin (770–781) in 778 (Hōki 9).

In 965, Emperor Murakami ordered that Imperial messengers were sent to report important events to Japan's guardian kami, including Kamo Wake-ikazuchi.

Kamigamo, along with the Shimogamo Shrine, was designated as one of two chief Shinto shrines (ichinomiya) for the former Yamashiro province.

Imperial visits
 794 (Enryaku 13): Emperor Kanmu came as part of a grand progress.
 942 (Tengyō 5, 29th day of the 4th month): Emperor Suzaku visited to offer thanks for restoration of peace.
 979 (Tengen 2, 10th day of the 10th month): Emperor En'yū decided that an Imperial visit Hachiman at Iwashimizu Shrine should be paired with a visit to Kamo.
 1711 (Hōei 8): Emperor Nakamikado took refuge in the Hosodono when the palace had become uninhabitable.

Structures
The jinja is famous for its haiden (worship hall), rebuilt in 1628-1629 (Kan'ei 6).

A number of priests' residences are situated on its grounds, and one, the Nishimura House, is open to the public.

Gallery

See also
 List of Shinto shrines
 Modern system of ranked Shinto Shrines
 Twenty-Two Shrines
 Yurihonjo hinakaido, an annual traditional doll display festival held in part of the shrine

Notes

References

 Breen, John and Mark Teeuwen. (2000).  Shinto in History: Ways of the Kami. Honolulu: University of Hawaii Press. 
 Iwao, Seiichi, Teizō Iyanaga, Susumu Ishii, Shōichirō Yoshida, et al.'' (2002).  Dictionnaire historique du Japon. Paris: Maisonneuve & Larose. ; OCLC 51096469
 Nelson, John K. (2000).  Enduring Identities: The Guise of Shinto in Contemporary Japan. Honolulu: University of Hawaii Press. 
 Ponsonby-Fane, Richard. (1959).  The Imperial House of Japan. Kyoto: Ponsonby Memorial Society. OCLC 194887
 . (1962).   Studies in Shinto and Shrines. Kyoto: Ponsonby Memorial Society. OCLC 399449
 . (1963).  Vicissitudes of Shinto. Kyoto: Ponsonby Memorial Society. OCLC 36655
 . (1964).  Visiting Famous Shrines in Japan. Kyoto: Ponsonby-Fane Memorial Society.

External links

 Kamigamo Shrine website 

National Treasures of Japan
Important Cultural Properties of Japan
Shinto shrines in Kyoto
World Heritage Sites in Japan
Historic Sites of Japan
7th-century establishments in Japan
Religious buildings and structures completed in 678
7th-century Shinto shrines
 Beppyo shrines
Kanpei-taisha